Sorn Davin (born in Phnom Penh on 6 February 1992) is a taekwondo practitioner who represented Cambodia at the 2012 Summer Olympics, carrying the flag for her country during the Parade of Nations, and losing 3–2 to defending gold medal champion María del Rosario Espinoza of Mexico in the opening round.

References

External links
 
 
 

1992 births
Living people
Sportspeople from Phnom Penh
Cambodian female taekwondo practitioners
Olympic taekwondo practitioners of Cambodia
Taekwondo practitioners at the 2012 Summer Olympics
Taekwondo practitioners at the 2010 Asian Games
Taekwondo practitioners at the 2014 Asian Games
Southeast Asian Games silver medalists for Cambodia
Southeast Asian Games medalists in taekwondo
Southeast Asian Games bronze medalists for Cambodia
Competitors at the 2009 Southeast Asian Games
Competitors at the 2011 Southeast Asian Games
Competitors at the 2013 Southeast Asian Games
Asian Games competitors for Cambodia